The Minnesota Military & Veterans Museum is the principal activity of the Military Historical Society of Minnesota (MHSM), a non-profit educational organization chartered to preserve and explain Minnesota’s military history.  It is federally recognized as a charitable 501(c)(3) organization.  MHSM operates the museum as a public–private partnership in cooperation with the Minnesota Historical Society and the Minnesota National Guard.  The museum, which is open to the general public year-round, is located a few blocks inside the main gate at Camp Ripley, a state-owned  military training center located on the Mississippi River just north of Little Falls in central Minnesota.  The museum is certified by the United States Army Center of Military History although its mission encompasses all branches of service.

Mission
The museum's mission is to document, preserve, and depict the stories and contributions of Minnesotans who served in all branches of service or on the home front—in time of peace and war—from Minnesota's early frontier years to the present.  It seeks to strengthen public understanding of how armed conflicts and military institutions have shaped Minnesota's state and national experience.  It also hopes museum visitors will gain a deeper appreciation for the actions and sacrifices of those who served.

Collections and exhibits
The museum is the largest and most comprehensive repository in Minnesota for military artifacts and records.  The collection holds nearly 35,000 artifacts: uniforms, weapons, equipment, insignia and flags, training aids, and personal items—objects central to the museum's core mission—as well as tanks, aircraft, vehicles, artillery pieces, etc..

The museum reference library on military history contains about 9,000 non-circulating books and pamphlets, including a very large collection of military technical and field manuals.  Special attention is given to materials that specifically relate to the military experiences of Minnesotans and to military units with Minnesota ties.  Paper archives include photographs (about 15,000), personal letters and diaries, scrapbooks, maps, posters, sheet music, periodicals and newspapers, and official correspondence, records, and orders.  Audio-visual materials include films, audio tapes, video tapes, DVDs and CDs.

Permanent exhibits
America at War – The causes, conduct, and consequences of America's major wars since Minnesota statehood in 1858.
State Forces – The story of Minnesota's state armed forces—most notably the National Guard—from pre-Civil War militia days to present-day worldwide deployments.
Forts on the Frontier – How Minnesota's early forts and garrisons kept the peace and aided Euro-American colonization of Native American lands in the western regions of the continent.  Special attention is given to Fort Ripley, a U.S. Army outpost on the Mississippi River that existed 1849–1877 within the boundaries of present-day Camp Ripley.
The Arms Room – The development of military small arms in the 19th and 20th centuries.  Pistols and revolvers, rifles and carbines, submachine guns, machine guns, edged weapons, ammunition, and more.
Honors – A tribute to Minnesotans who received the Medal of Honor, plus military decorations past and present.
Story of the Jeep – The fabled American military Jeep and Minnesota's role in its development.  Six representative models are on display, from early World War II until phase-out in the 1980s (open summers only).

Outdoor exhibits
Vehicles, tanks, aircraft, artillery, etc. are on display throughout the museum grounds.  Visitors can step inside a rare 40 & 8 boxcar used to transport American troops and horses in France during World War I, or inspect one of Camp Ripley's ubiquitous “tin huts,” outfitted c. 1965.

Special exhibits
In addition to permanent exhibits, the museum typically presents temporary exhibits on changing topics.  In recent years these have included:
Women in the Ranks
Remembering Pearl Harbor
Airborne!
History of the Minnesota-based 34th Infantry Division 1917–Present
Norwegian-Americans and the 99th Infantry Battalion (Sep) during World War Two
Minnesota in the American Civil War

Facilities
The museum's main building was originally used during the summer at Camp Ripley as a regimental headquarters for the Minnesota National Guard. Its architecture was inspired by the buildings of Fort Ripley, a 19th-century frontier army post (1849–1877) once located a few miles upriver. The building was expanded and remodeled in 1986–1987 for exclusive use by the museum. It still houses most of the museum's exhibits, administrative offices, and the gift shop, but since 1987 several adjacent buildings have also been rehabbed to provide work, storage and exhibit space.

References

External links

Minnesota Military Museum website
National Museum of the U.S. Army
National Museum of the U.S. Navy
National Museum of the U.S. Air Force
National Museum of the U.S. Marine Corps
U.S. Coast Guard Museum

Military and war museums in Minnesota
History museums in Minnesota
Museums in Morrison County, Minnesota
Museums established in 1977